Northeastern Line is a railway line in Thailand that connects the capital Bangkok with the northeast region of Isan. The section from Bangkok to Nakhon Ratchasima is Thailand's first line that opened for passenger service. The line is also a key section on the central route of the Kunming–Singapore railway.

Route description

The Northeastern Line shares tracks with Northern Line between Bangkok and Ban Phachi Junction. It has three main branches:
 Ubon Ratchathani Main Line, between Bangkok and Ubon Ratchathani 
 Nong Khai Main Line, between Bangkok and Nong Khai, branching off after Nakhon Ratchasima. The line also crosses the Thai-Lao border into Thanaleng. An extension is currently being constructed to the new Khamsavath railway station.
 Lam Narai Branch Line

Timeline

Ubon Ratchathani Main Line 
 9 March 1891 - started construction
 26 March 1897 - opened Bangkok – Ayutthaya
 1 November 1897 - Ayutthaya – Kaeng Khoi
 21 December 1900 - opened Kaeng Khoi – Nakhon Ratchasima
 1 November 1922 - opened Nakhon Ratchasima–Tha Chang near a pier on Mun river that allowed boat service between Tha Chang and Ubon Ratchathani along Mun river
 1 April 1925 - opened Tha Chang – Buriram
 1 August 1928 - opened Buriram – Sisaket
 1 April 1930 - opened Sisaket – Ubon Ratchathani

SRT also built a short railway line from Bung Wai to Ban Pho Mun which was opened on 1 August 1930, but the line was closed on 1 December 1954 due to the construction of Seri Prachathippatai bridge (officially opened in 1955) that allowed the connection between Ubon Ratchathani city and Ubon Ratchathani without the need for ferry across Mun river.

Nong Khai Main Line 
 1 April 1933 - opened Nakhon Ratchasima – Khon Kaen
 24 June 1941 - Khon Kaen – Udon Thani
 13 September 1955 - Udon Thani – Na Tha (first Nong Khai station)
 31 July 1958 - Na Tha – Nong Khai (Talat Nong Khai, second Nong Khai station)
 2008 - Nong Khai (new, third and current Nong Khai station) – Talat Nong Khai section closed.
 5 March 2009 - Nong Khai – Thanaleng (Vientiane Prefecture)

An extension from Thanaleng to Vientiane is currently under construction.

Kaeng Khoi–Bua Yai (Lam Narai) Branch Line 
 19 August 1967 - entire line opened Kaeng Khoi Junction–Bua Yai Junction.

See also 
 Rail transport in Laos
 Boten–Vientiane railway
 Kaeng Khoi Line: railway line of the Greater Bangkok commuter rail
 Northern Line (Thailand)
 Eastern Line (Thailand)
 Southern Line (Thailand)

References

External links 
 SRT route map

Railway lines in Thailand
Railway lines opened in 1896
Metre gauge railways in Thailand